Ana Juan (born 1961 in Valencia, Spain) is a Spanish artist, illustrator and painter.

Life and career
After graduating in fine arts from Universidad Politécnica in Valencia (1982), she moved to Madrid at the height of the movida madrileña and in the early 1980s she collaborated with magazines such as La Luna and Madriz (where "for the first seven months of the magazine's life, [she] was the only regular female artist" and for which "she authored seventeen comic book works" and illustrated many scripts for other artists).

In 1991, she temporarily moved to Paris and exhibited in Geneva and New York. In 1994, she received a fellowship by the Japanese publishing house Kodansha and lived in Japan for three months.

Back in Madrid in 1995, she started contributing to The New Yorker, for which she has designed more than 20 covers over the years, among which "Solidarité", after the Charlie Hébdo shooting in Paris.

In 1998 and 1999, she was awarded the Gold Medal (category: Illustration) by the Society of Newspaper Design and on September 24, 2010, she was awarded the “Premio Nacional de Ilustración” by the Spanish Ministry of Culture.

She currently creates her own books (texts and illustrations), exhibits her work all over the world (Spain, Mexico, Japan, Italy…) and contributes to many Spanish and international magazines. She has also illustrated many Isabel Allende’s book covers for Plaza e Janés (Penguin Random House), including Retrato en Sepia, Eva Luna, El cuaderno de Maya, Of Love and Shadows. She is one of the very few artists who was allowed by the author himself to illustrate a book by Stephen King, namely The Man in the Black Suit (El hombre del traje negro, Nórdica Libros, 2017).

Exhibitions

Solo exhibitions
 1988 Galerie Notuno, Geneve
 1989 Galería Mama Graf, Seville
 1992 "Graphic works", Galería del Progreso, Madrid
 1992 121 Greene Street Gallery, New York
 1993 "Graphic works", Galería Viciana, Valencia
 1993 "Graphic works", Galería Bubión, Granada
 1993 "Graphic works", Galería Jordi Barnadas, Barcelona
 1993 Galería del Progreso, Madrid
 1994 121 Greene Street Gallery, New York
 1994 Art Miami, 121 Greene Street Gallery, New York
 1997 Galería Taller Mayor 28, Madrid
 1997 Galería Tiempos Modernos, Madrid
 1998 "Sculpture", Galería Tiempos Modernos, Madrid
 1999 Bellreguard, Casa de Cultura, Valencia
 1999 Galería Sen, Madrid
 2000 Artexpo 2000, Galería María José Castellví, Barcelona
 2005 "Cor i Foscor", Casal Solleric, Palma de Mallorca
 2011 "Snowhite's Secret Box", Museo ABC, Madrid
 2012 "Snowhite's Secret Box", Pinacoteca di Bologna
 2014 "Ana Juan. Posters 2002–2014", La factoría de papel, Madrid
 2014 "Amantes", "Carmilla", "Frida" and "Snowhite", Museo de la ciudad, Querétaro
 2017 "Dibujando al otro lado", Museo ABC, Madrid 16.03.17–18.06.17
 2017 "El hombre del traje negro", exhibition of the original works, Panta Rhei, Madrid
2019 "Anna dei miracoli", open-air exhibition by #logosedizioni & CHEAP, via Indipendenza and via San Giuseppe, Bologna

Group exhibitions
 1991 "Arco 91", Ediciones Dos Negritos, Madrid
 1992 "Collage", Galería del Progreso, Madrid
 1993 "El canto de la tripulación", Galería Detursa, Madrid
 1993 "X Anniversary", Galería Viciana, Valencia
 1993 "Bestiario", Galería del Progreso, Madrid
 1994 "El muro de Woodstock", Woodstock94, Woodstock
 1995 "Falsos originales", Galería Maeght, Barcelona
 1995 "L’Homme sans tête", Galerie Michel Lagarde, Paris
 1995 "El objeto del arte", Fundación Juan March, Cuenca
 1999 "Tango", Galerie Contours, Hamburg
 2001 "Arco 2001", Galería Sen, Madrid
 2001 "Los cuatro sentidos", Galería Maria José Castellví, Barcelona
 2001 "La elegancia del espíritu", Galería María José Castellví, Barcelona
 2001 "Mi mejor amigo", Galería Sen, Madrid
 2001 "Tipos ilustrados", Cromotex, Madrid
 2012 "Les couvertures du New Yorker", Galerie Martel, Paris
 2014 Latin Beat Film Festival, T-Site Daikanyama, Tokyo, with Roger Olmos and Alejandro Magallanes
 2016 "Sobras de arte", La factoría de papel, Madrid
 2017 "Sobras de arte", La factoría de papel, Madrid
 2017 "El tercer año", La factoría de papel, Madrid
 2017 "Fanzination. Los fanzines de cómic en España", Institut Valencià d'Art Modern (IVAM), Valencia 
 2017 "Los siete pecados capitales", Espai Refugi @ Galería Shiras, Valencia
 2017–18 "Pasa página. Una invitación a la lectura", Museo Biblioteca Nacional de España, Madrid
 2018 "Under the Influence: The Private Collection of  Peter de Sève”, Society of Illustrators, New York
 2019 “Milagros”, Instituto Cervantes, Roma (with Roger Olmos)
2019 “Milagros”, Instituto Cervantes, Naples (with Roger Olmos)
2020 "The Turn of the Screw", online exhibition
2020 "Bestiario para después de…", La factoría de papel, Madrid

Prizes and awards
 1984: Best cover of the year, Saló del Còmic de Barcelona, Spain, Revista MADRIZ nº 3
 1988: Trofeo Laus 88 for Best Advertising Illustration, Spain, Paga tú
 1994: Kodansha Publishing scholarship, Japan
 1995, 1996, 1997 and 1998: Silver Medal by the Society of Newspaper Design, category: Illustration
 1996, 1997 and 1998: Gold Medal by the Society of Newspaper Design, category: Illustration
1996, 1997 and 1998: Excellence Award, Society of Newspaper Design, USA, Art and Illustration portfolio / Two or more colors
 2001: “Best illustrated book” by the Conselleria de Cultura Educació i Ciència de la Generalitat Valenciana for Snowhite, Edicions de Ponent
 2005: The Ezra Jack Keats for The Night Eater, Arthur Levine Books, USA
 2005: Comston Book Award, Minnesota State University, USA
 2006: Lupine Award, Picture Book Winner (category: illustrator), Maine, USA
 2007: Junceda Iberia Prize, APIC – Asociación de Ilustradores de Cataluña, for For you are a Kenyan Child, Simon & Schuster, Spain
2007-2008: Prize for the best book published in the Valencian Community, category: best book published in Castilian Spanish, Demeter, Edicions de Ponent
2009: Mention for the Premio CCEI de Ilustración, Bibi y las bailarinas, Alfaguara
 2010: National Illustration Award, Spanish Ministry of Culture, Spain 
 2012: San Carlos Medal, Facultad de BBAA, Valencia, Spain
 2017: Golden Award of the ADCV, in the category "new media: installations” for the interactive exhibition “Ana Juan. Dibujando al otro lado” (in collaboration with the Politécnico de Valencia)
 2017: Golden Award of the ADCV, in the category "new media: gaming” for the project “Earthland, Snowhite’s Mystery Tale” (simultaneous to the exhibition “Ana Juan. Dibujando al otro lado”, in collaboration with the Politécnico de Valencia)
2020: Premio Gràffica

Books

 2001, Amantes, 1000 editions, Spain
 2001, Snowhite, Edicions de Ponent, Spain
 2002, Frida (texts by Jonah Winter), Arthur Levine Books, USA
 2004, Elena's Serenade (texts by Campbell Geeslin), Simon & Schuster, USA
 2004, The Night Eater, Arthur Levine Books, USA
 2006, For You Are a Kenyan Child (texts by Kelly Cunnane), Simon & Schuster, USA
 2007, Demeter (texts by Bram Stoker), Edicions de Ponent, Spain
 2007, The Jewel Box Ballerinas (texts by Monique de Varennes), Schwartz & Wade Books, Random House, USA
 2008, Bibi y las bailarinas (texts by Monique de Varennes), Alfaguara, Spain
 2008, The Elephant Wish (texts by Lou Berger), Schwartz & Wade Books, Random House, New York, USA
 2008, Cuentos esenciales (texts by Guy de Maupassant, translation by José Ramón Monreal), Literatura Random House, Spain
 2010, Amantes (translation by Fabio Regattin), #logosedizioni, Italy
 2010, Circus, #logosedizioni, Italy
 2010, L’isola (texts by Matz Mainka, translation by Antonella Lami), #logosedizioni, Italy
 2011, The Girl Who Circumnavigated Fairyland in a Ship of Her Own Making (texts by Catheryne M. Valente), Feiwel & Friends, USA
 2011, The Pet Shop Revolution, Arthur Levine Books, USA
 2011, Snowhite (translation by Antonella Lami and Bill Dodd), #logosedizioni, Italy
 2011, Sorelle (texts by Matz Mainka, translation by Antonella Lami), #logosedizioni, Italy
 2011, Cartoline Ana Juan, #logosedizioni, Italy
 2011, Wakefield (texts by Nathaniel Hawthorne, translation by María José Chuliá), Nørdica Libros, Spain
 2012, Promesse (texts by Matz Mainka), #logosedizioni, Italy
 2012, Demeter (texts by Bram Stoker, translation by Antonella Lami), #logosedizioni, Italy
 2012, The Girl Who Fell Beneath Fairyland and Led the Revels There (texts by Catheryne M. Valente), Feiwel & Friends, USA
 2013, The Girl Who Soared Over Fairyland and Cut the Moon in Two (texts by Catheryne M. Valente), Feiwel & Friends, USA
 2013, Carmilla (texts by Sheridan Le Fanu, translation by Juan Elías Tovar Cross), Fondo de cultura económica, Mexico
 2013, Otra vuelta de tuerca (texts by Henry James, translation by José Bianco), Galaxia Gutenberg, Spain
 2014, Mi querida Babel (music and texts by Juan Pablo Silvestre, concept by Oscar Mariné), La mano cornutta, Spain
 2014, Ana Juan. Catalogo, #logosedizioni, Italy
 2015, Carmilla (texts by Sheridan Le Fanu, translation by Francesca Del Moro), #logosedizioni, Italia
 2015, Lacrimosa (texts by Matz Mainka), #logosedizioni, Italy
 2015, The Boy Who Lost Fairyland (texts by Catheryne M. Valente), Feiwel & Friends, USA
 2016, Hermanas (texts by Matz Mainka), Edelvives, Spain
 2016, Frida (texts by Jonah Winter, translation by Fabio Regattin), #logosedizioni, Italy
 2017, El hombre del traje negro (texts by Stephen King, translation by Íñigo Jáuregui), Nørdica Libros, Spain
 2018, Pelea como una chica (texts by Sandra Sabates), Editorial Planeta, Spain
 2019, Anna dei miracoli (translation by Valentina Vignoli), #logosedizioni (in collaboration with CBM Italia), Italy
 2019, Un milagro para Helen, Libros del zorro rojo, Spain
 2019, Otra vuelta de tuerca (texts by Henry James, translation by José Bianco), Lunwerg, Spain
 2020, La vida secreta de los gatos (texts by Marta Sanz), Lunwerg, Spain
 2020, L’uomo vestito di nero (texts by Stephen King, translation by Silvia Fornasiero), Sperling & Kupfer, Italy
 2020, Ortigas a manos llenas (texts by Sara Mesa), librerías de La Conspiración de la Pólvora, Editorial La uÑa RoTa, Editorial Delirio, La Moderna editora, Spain
 2020, Revolución en la tienda de animales, Baobab, Planeta, Spain
 2021, La vita segreta dei gatti (texts by Marta Sanz, translation by Federico Taibi), #logosedizioni, Italia

Book covers 

 2006, La casa de los espíritus, by Isabel Allende, Debolsillo, España
 2006, Retrato en sepia, by Isabel Allende, Debolsillo, España
 2006, Mi país inventado, by Isabel Allende, Debolsillo, España
 2011, Inés del alma mía, by Isabel Allende, Random House Mondadori, España
 2011, El cuaderno de Maya, by Isabel Allende, Random House Mondadori, España
 2011, La suma de los días, by Isabel Allende, Plaza & Janes Editores, España
 2011, Hija de la fortuna, by Isabel Allende, Random House Mondadori, España
 2011, La isla bajo el mar, by Isabel Allende, Random House Mondadori, España
 2011, Il quaderno di Maya, by Isabel Allende, Feltrinelli, Italia
 2012, Amor, by Isabel Allende, Plaza & Janes Editores, España
 2012, Cuentos de Eva Luna, by Isabel Allende, Plaza & Janes Editores, España
 2013, Ritratto in seppia, by Isabel Allende, Feltrinelli, Italia
 2013, Il mio paese inventato, by Isabel Allende, Feltrinelli, Italia
 2013, Inés dell’anima mia, by Isabel Allende, Feltrinelli, Italia
 2014, La città delle bestie, by Isabel Allende, Feltrinelli, Italia
 2014, Paula, by Isabel Allende, Feltrinelli, Italia
 2015, Paula / La suma de los días, by Isabel Allende, Debolsillo, España
 2015, La somma dei giorni, by Isabel Allende, Feltrinelli, Italia
 2015, Il regno del drago d’oro, by Isabel Allende, Feltrinelli, Italia
 2015, L’isola sotto il mare, by Isabel Allende, Feltrinelli, Italia
 2017, Paula, by Isabel Allende, Debolsillo, España
 2018, Eva Luna, by Isabel Allende, Debolsillo, España
 2019, El plan infinito, by Isabel Allende, Debolsillo, España
 2020, El libro de los anhelos, by Sue Monk Kidd, Ediciones B, España
 2020, De amor y de sombra, by Isabel Allende, Plaza & Janes Editores, España

Covers for The New Yorker 

 13 July 1998, New Yorker July 13th, 1998
 2 August 1999, City in Mourning
 31 July 2000, A Star is Born
 2 October 2000, Page-turner
 4 March 2002, Let the Fur Fly
 16 September 2002, Dawn Over Lower Manhattan
 14 April 2003, Action
 2 February 2004, Huddling for Warmth
 10 May 2004, Open Wound
 27 September 2004, Brought to Heel
 13 & 20 June 2005, Début on the Beach
 12 September 2005, Requiem
 3 March 2008, Fading
 10 March 2008, Blossoms
 1 September 2008, Object of Desire
 8 February 2010, Baby, it’s Cold Outside
 29 March 2010, Homage
 12 September 2011, Reflections
 25 March 2013, Art and Architecture
 27 May 2013, Defiance
 24 March 2014, Metamorphosis
 19 January 2015, Solidarité
 19 & 26 December 2016, Yule Dog
 8 October 2018, Unheard

More 

 2002, Film poster for A Snake of June, by Kayju Teather and Shinya Tsukamoto, Japan
 2002, Cover Venti4 Magazine Imperi dei sensi
 2006, Poster for Latin Beat Film Festival
 2006, Poster for Feria del Libro de Madrid
 2007, Poster for Latin Beat Film Festival
 2008, Poster for Latin Beat Film Festival
 2010, Poster for Latin Beat Film Festival
 2011, Poster for the Campaña fomento de la lectura, Fundació Bromera
 2012, Poster for Cirque Jules Verne, Saison Équestre 2012–13
 2012, Isabel Allende slipcase, Random House Mondadori
 2013, Manifesto Latin Beat Film Festival
 2020, Tarot Cats, Fournier
 2020, Poster for the XXIX Festival Internacional en el Camino de Santiago

References

External links
 

1961 births
Living people
20th-century Spanish women artists
21st-century Spanish women artists
Spanish illustrators
Spanish women illustrators
Spanish women painters
Painters from the Valencian Community
Artists from Madrid
The New Yorker people
Spanish children's book illustrators